Hamilton Timbira Dias dos Santos Júnior, best known as Juninho Petrolina (born 14 December 1974) is a Brazilian association football who plays for FC Kəpəz on loan from FK Khazar Lankaran as a midfielder.

Career
Juninho Petrolina began his professional career in 1995 with Sport Club do Recife and played for a number of clubs in the Campeonato Brasileiro Série A, including Atlético Mineiro, Vitória, Santa Cruz and Náutico. He also played for Beira-Mar, Belenenses and F.C. Penafiel in Portugal and Happy Valley AA and South China in Hong Kong and FK Khazar Lankaran in Azerbaijan. He is currently playing for FC Kəpəz.

References

1974 births
Living people
Brazilian footballers
Brazilian expatriate footballers
Association football midfielders
Clube Atlético Mineiro players
Esporte Clube Vitória players
Sport Club do Recife players
Santa Cruz Futebol Clube players
C.F. Os Belenenses players
F.C. Penafiel players
Happy Valley AA players
South China AA players
Primeira Liga players
Hong Kong First Division League players
Expatriate footballers in Hong Kong
Brazilian expatriate sportspeople in Hong Kong
People from Petrolina
Sportspeople from Pernambuco